Estancia , officially the Municipality of Estancia,  is a 2nd class municipality in the province of Iloilo, Philippines. According to the 2020 census, it has a population of 53,200 people.

History

Estancia was originally a ranch for a wealthy Spaniard named Rodrigo who married a local woman. Estancia is not known for its agricultural products nor livestock but rather for its location as it is adjacent to Carles' 's impressive marine resources. Estancia has a fish port and a pier - these being one of the most developed in Northern Visayas, a banking industry, cable television, a hospital (adjacent only, that belongs to the Municipality of Balasan) and resorts.

Estancia is known around the country as a center for commercial fishing, so much so that it shares to carries the name Alaska of the Philippines. The name “Alaska of the Philippines” reflects back from the early 1900s up to pre-World War II when major commercial fishing activities were within Carles fishing ground and a small portion of Estancia water territory, with bountiful catches, running out a place to process and preserve their catch ended up rotting by beaches. Commercial fishing boats from Cebu, Capiz, Samar, Leyte, Masbate, and Negros came to Carles to fish. As a testament to its location adjacent to Carles' bountiful marine resources. The reason for this is that Carles lies in the Visayan Sea triangle, an imaginary triangle extending from the provinces of Iloilo, Negros, Cebu, Samar, and Masbate. This triangle is a part of the "Sulu-Sulawesi Triangle" of the Sulu Sea and neighboring Indonesia where a large concentration of marine organisms coupled with climate conditions support a massive marine ecosystem. Various commercial species are harvested along Carles' waters, namely mackerel, barracuda, sardines, shad, pompano, grouper, squid, cuttlefish, shrimp, prawns, shells, seaweed and others, these all catch from Carles' water territory and brought to fish ports of Estancia and Bancal, Carles.

The method predominantly used are purse seining, trawling and gill netting as these are suited for the relatively shallow waters (up to 60 fathoms) of the Visayan Sea.

However, as of recent years, pollution, heavy overfishing, and irresponsible fishing practices have slowly diminished the once abundant fish stocks of Estancia, and now problems like diminishing catches and unpredictable weather are beginning to surface. These factors have raised awareness in the government as well as the private sector and currently an artificial reef is off the shore of Brgy. Paon in an attempt to provide juvenile fish with shelter in hopes of restocking these once populous waters. For now, Estancia is experiencing an influx of investments as Gaisano Grand put up their first mall in the 5th District of Iloilo, also Prince Hypermart and some malls like CityMall shows interest to come in.

Geography

Barangays
Estancia is politically subdivided into 25 barangays.

Climate

Demographics

Economy

Natural disasters

Typhoon Haiyan
Parts of Estancia were heavily damaged by Typhoon Haiyan. The roof of Northern Iloilo State University (NISU: Estancia) was completely torn off. Estancia Central School was also hit by the said typhoon and almost all of the classrooms were totally damaged.  The Principal (Dr. Gerry J. Tingson) of the said school with his utmost will is now trying to restore the damages caused by typhoon Haiyan through national and foreign aid. Other parts of the town that suffered damage included the market and the port.

Media
91.5 Radyo Natin / Hot FM
106.7 Radyo Natin / Hearts FM
List of Radio & Television Station in Iloilo

References

External links
 [ Philippine Standard Geographic Code]
 Philippine Standard Geographic Code/ Iloilo/ Estancia
 Philippine Census Information
 Local Governance Performance Management System 

Municipalities of Iloilo